Lemland List (in Swedish: Lemlandslistan) is an electoral alliance of the Independents and the Freeminded in the municipality of Lemland, Åland, Finland.

In the 1999 elections the list won three seats in the municipal council. Prior to the 1999 elections the Centre Party had also taken part in the list. The list also contested the 2003 elections, winning seats.

External links
2003 candidate lists
Political parties in Åland
Political party alliances in Finland
Liberal conservative parties
Conservative parties in Finland